= 1921 Gotha state election =

German state election

The 1921 Gotha state election was held on 6 March 1921 to elect the 15 members of the Landtag of Gotha.

== Results ==
Party	Votes	%	Seats	+/–
Heimatbund	42,072	52.27	8	–New
Communist Party of Germany	25,582	31.78	5	New
Independent Social Democratic Party of Germany	8,493	10.55	1	–8
Social Democratic Party of Germany	4,349	5.40	1	+1
Total	80,496	100.00	15	–4
Source: Elections in the Weimar Republic
